Hopeless Romantic may refer to:

 Hopeless Romantic (The Bouncing Souls album), a 1999 album
 Hopeless Romantic (Michelle Branch album), a 2017 album
 "Hopeless Romantic" (Michelle Branch song), the title song
 "Hopeless Romantic", a song by Meghan Trainor from her 2016 album Thank You
 "Hopeless Romantic", a song by Sam Fischer
 "Hopeless Romantic" (Wiz Khalifa song), a 2018 song
 Hopeless Romantics, a 2005 album by Michael Feinstein

See also 
 “Call Me Hopeless, Not Romantic”, a song on Mayday Parade's eponymous 2011 album
 Para sa Hopeless Romantic, a 2015 Philippine teen romance film